This is an inclusive list of science fiction television programs whose names begin with the letter C.

C

Live-action 
 Caminhos do Coração a.k.a. Paths of the Heart (franchise):
 Caminhos do Coração a.k.a. Paths of the Heart (2007–2008, Brazil)
 Os Mutantes: Caminhos do Coração a.k.a. The Mutants: Pathways of the Heart (2008–2009, Brazil, spin-off)
 Cape, The (1996–1997)
 Cape, The (2011) (elements of science fiction)
 Caprica (2010)
 Captain Midnight (1954–1958) 
 Captain Scarlet (franchise):
 Captain Scarlet and the Mysterons (1967–1968, UK, puppetry)
 Captain Scarlet vs the Mysterons (1980, Captain Scarlet and the Mysterons compilation, puppetry, film)
 Revenge of the Mysterons from Mars (1981, Captain Scarlet and the Mysterons compilation, puppetry, film)
 Captain Video and His Video Rangers (1949–1955)
 Captain Vyom – The Sky Warrior (1998–1999, India)
 Captain Z-Ro (1951–1956)
 Captain Zep – Space Detective (1983–1984, UK)
 Cavemen (2007) (elements of science fiction)
 Century City (2004–2005)
 Century Falls (1993, UK)
 Chameleon (franchise):
 Chameleon (1998, film)
 Chameleon II: Death Match (1999, film)
 Chameleon 3: Dark Angel (2000, film)
 Chameleons (1989, pilot) IMDb
 Champions, The (1968–1969, UK)
 Changes, The (1975, UK)
 Charlie Jade (2005, Canada/South Africa)
 Children of the Dog Star (1984, New Zealand, miniseries)
 Children of the Stones (1977, UK, elements of science fiction)
 Chocky (1984–1985, UK)
 Chronicle, The (2001–2002) (elements of science fiction in some episodes)
 City Beneath the Sea (franchise):
 Plateau of Fear (1961, UK) IMDb
 City Beneath the Sea (1962, UK, Plateau of Fear sequel) IMDb
 Secret Beneath the Sea (1963, UK, 1962 City Beneath the Sea sequel) IMDb
 City Beneath the Sea (1971, film, pilot)
 City Cat (1993, Yugoslavia, film)
 Clangers (1969–1974, UK)
 Cleopatra 2525 (2000–2001)
 Cliffhangers (1979)
 Clifton House Mystery, The (1978)
 Clone (2008, UK)
 Code 404 (2020–present, UK)
 Code Name: Eternity (1999–2000, Canada)
 Codename Icarus (1981)
 Collector, The a.k.a. Sakupljac (2005–2006, Serbia, anthology)
 Colony (2015-2018)
 Come Back Mrs. Noah (1977–1978, UK)
 Commando Cody: Sky Marshall of the Universe (1955)
 Continuum (2012–2015, Canada)
 Counterpart (2017-2019)
 Counterstrike (1969, UK)
 Cowboy Bebop (2021)
 Crash – Truslen fra det sorte hul a.k.a. Crash – The Menace from the Black Hole (1984, Denmark)
 Crime Traveller (1997, UK)
 Crossing, The (2018)
 Cybergirl (2001–2002, Australia)
 Cybersix (1995, Argentina)
Animated
 C.O.P.S. (1988, animated)
 Cadillacs and Dinosaurs (1993–1994, animated)
 Captain Earth (2014, Japan, animated)
 Captain Future a.k.a. Capitaine Flam (France), a.k.a. Capitan Futuro (Italy), a.k.a. Capitán Futuro (Spain/Latin America), a.k.a. Knight of Space, The (Arabic) (1978–1979, Japan, animated)
Captain Harlock (franchise):
 Space Pirate Captain Harlock (1978–1979, Japan, animated)
 Galaxy Express 999 (1978–1981, Japan, animated)
 Space Symphony Maetel (2004–2005, Japan, Galaxy Express 999 sequel, animated)
 Space Pirate Captain Herlock: The Endless Odyssey (2002, Japan, animated)
 Harlock Saga (1998–1999, Japan, animated)
 Arcadia of My Youth: Endless Orbit SSX (1982–1983, Japan, animated)
 Queen Emeraldas (1998–1999, Japan, animated)
 Captain Harlock and the Queen of a Thousand Years (1985–1986, US/Japan, animated)
 Queen Millennia (1981–1982, Japan, animated)
 Captain Planet and the Planeteers (1993–1996, animated)
 Captain Power and the Soldiers of the Future (1987–1988, Canada/US, partly animated)
 Captain Scarlet (franchise):
 Gerry Anderson's New Captain Scarlet a.k.a. New Captain Scarlet (2005, UK, animated)
 Captain Simian & the Space Monkeys (1996–1997, animated)
 Captain Star (1997–1998, UK/Canada/Spain, animated)
 Cars Toons: Mater's Tall Tales (2008–2012, animated) (elements of science fiction in the Unidentified Flying Mater episode)
 Casshern (franchise):
 Casshern Sins (2008–2009, Japan, animated, Neo-Human Casshern reboot)
 Neo-Human Casshern (1973–1974, Japan, animated)
 Centurions, The (1985–1987, animated)
 Chargeman Ken! (1973, Japan, animated)
 Chō Kōsoku Galvion (1984, Japan, animated)
 Chobits (2002, Japan, animated)
 Chōdenji Machine Voltes V (1977–1978, Japan, animated)
 Chōdenji Robo Combattler V (1976–1977, Japan, animated)
 Chojin Sentai Barattack (1977–1978, Japan, animated)
 Chrome Shelled Regios (2009, Japan, animated)
 Cleopatra in Space (2019-current, animated)
Cobra (franchise):
 Space Cobra (1982–1983, Japan, animated)
 Cobra the Animation: Rokunin no Yushi (2010, Japan, animated)
 Code-E (franchise):
 Code-E (2007, Japan, animated)
 Mission-E (2008, Japan, animated)
 Code Geass (franchise):
 Code Geass: Lelouch of the Rebellion a.k.a. Code Geass (2006–2007, Japan, animated)
 Code Geass: Lelouch of the Rebellion R2 (2008, Japan, animated)
 Code Lyoko (franchise):
 Garage Kids (2001, France/US, Code Lyoko pilot, animated)
 Code Lyoko (2003–2007, France, animated)
 Code Lyoko: Evolution (2012–2013, France, partly animated)
 Colonel Bleep (1957–1960, United States, animated)
 Combat Mecha Xabungle (1982–1983, Japan, animated)
 Coppelion (2013, Japan, animated)
 Cosmic Quantum Ray (2009, Germany, animated)
 Cosmo Warrior Zero (2001, Japan, animated)
 Courage the Cowardly Dog (1999–2002, animated) (elements of science fiction in some episodes)
 Cowboy Bebop (1998–1999, Japan, animated)
 Coyote Ragtime Show (2006, Japan, animated)
 Crest of the Stars Trilogy (franchise):
 Crest of the Stars (1999, Japan, animated)
 Banner of the Stars (2001, Japan, animated)
 Banner of the Stars II (2001, Japan, animated)
 Cubix (2001–2003, South Korea, animated) a.k.a. Cubix: Robots for Everyone (US)
 Cybersix (1999, Canada/Argentina, animated)
Cyborg 009 (franchise):
 Cyborg 009 (1968, Japan, animated)
 Cyborg 009 (1979–1980, Japan, animated)
 Cyborg 009 (2001–2002, Japan, animated)

References

Television programs, C